The large amount of lists of  LGBT characters and media within the scope of "fiction and myth", which has been divided into the following:

Lists

Characters
By medium

 List of animated series with LGBT characters 
 LGBT representation in animated web series
 List of bisexual characters in television
 List of feature films with bisexual characters
 List of feature films with gay characters
 List of feature films with lesbian characters
 List of feature films with transgender characters
 List of film franchises with LGBT characters
 List of gay characters in television

 List of graphic art works with LGBT characters
 List of lesbian characters in television
 List of LGBT characters in radio and podcasts
 List of LGBT characters in soap operas
 List of LGBT characters in modern written fiction
 List of LGBT-related films
List of LGBT-themed speculative fiction
 List of made-for-television films with LGBT characters
 Lists of television programs with LGBT characters
 List of transgender characters in television
 List of video games with LGBT characters
 List of webcomics with LGBT characters

By type
 List of fictional pansexual characters
 List of fictional asexual characters
 List of fictional aromantic characters
 List of fictional trans characters 
 List of fictional non-binary characters
 List of fictional polyamorous characters
 List of fictional intersex characters
 List of fictional bisexual characters
 List of fictional lesbian characters
 List of fictional gay characters

LGBT themes
 LGBT themes in comics
 LGBT themes in American mainstream comics
 LGBT themes in horror fiction
 LGBT themes in mythology
 LGBT themes in African diasporic mythologies
 LGBT themes in Chinese mythology
 LGBT themes in classical mythology
 LGBT themes in Hindu mythology
 LGBT themes in video games

Other 

 Disney and LGBT representation in animation
 Sexuality in The Lord of the Rings
 Sexuality in Star Trek